Pure Getz is an album by saxophonist Stan Getz which was recorded in New York City and San Francisco in 1982 and released on the Concord Jazz label.

Reception

The Allmusic review by Scott Yanow said "Getz is particularly swinging on "Tempus Fugit" and quite lyrical on Billy Strayhorn's "Blood Count"".

Track listing
 "On the Up and Up" (Jim McNeely) - 8:10 	
 "Blood Count" (Billy Strayhorn) - 3:34
 "Very Early" (Bill Evans) - 7:05
 "Sippin' at Bell's" (Miles Davis) - 5:02
 "I Wish I Knew" (Harry Warren, Mack Gordon) - 7:52
 "Come Rain or Come Shine" (Harold Arlen, Johnny Mercer) - 8:07
 "Tempus Fugit" (Bud Powell) - 7:17  
Recorded at Coast Recorders, San Francisco, California on January 29, 1982 (tracks 1, 2, 4 & 7) and Soundmixers, New York City on February 5, 1982 (tracks 3, 5 & 6)

Personnel 
Stan Getz - tenor saxophone
Jim McNeely - piano
Marc Johnson - bass
Billy Hart (tracks 3, 5 & 6), Victor Lewis (tracks 1, 2, 4 & 7) - drums

References 

1982 albums
Stan Getz albums
Concord Records albums
Albums produced by Carl Jefferson